High Inquisitor may refer to:

 Grand Inquisitor, the lead official of the Inquisition
 Hogwarts High Inquisitor, fictional character in J. K. Rowling's Harry Potter series
 Imperial High Inquisitor, fictional character in the Star Wars franchise